The New Song and Dance is the debut album by the dance-punk/post-punk revival band Radio 4, released in 2000.

The album was recorded cheaply, making for a messy but angry and fast sound. The New Song and Dance was mildly successful with critics, who likened the album's sound to that of the Clash.

Track list 

All songs written and performed by Radio 4.

"How the Stars Got Crossed" – 3:42
"Buy and Sell" – 3:35
"We Must Be Sure" – 3:13
"Boy Meets Girl" – 3:15
"Beat Around the Bush" – 2:50
"Get Set to Fall Out" – 2:23
"Election Day" – 3:22
"Walls Falling" – 2:58
"(No More Room for) Communication" – 2:55
"Beautiful Ride" – 2:56
"New Motive" – 3:06

Personnel 

 Anthony Roman – bass, lead vocals (Roman is Radio 4's official lead vocalist)
 Tommy Williams – guitars, vocals (lead vocals on "Buy and Sell", "Boy Meets Girl", "Get Set To Fall Out", "Walls Falling" and "Communication")
 Greg Collins – drums, vocals
 Tim O'Heir – production, percussion
 Ross Totino – keyboard (though not actually a member of Radio 4)

Notes 

2000 debut albums
Radio 4 (band) albums